Johann Baptist Georg Neruda (Czech: ,  – ) was a Czech classical composer, violinist and cellist.

Life
Neruda's dates of birth and death (taken from the Grove Dictionary) are only approximations. He was born in Kingdom of Bohemia, now part of the Czech Republic, to a well-respected musical family. After spending his earlier years gaining a good reputation as a violinist and conductor in Prague and Germany, Neruda became Konzertmeister of the Dresden court orchestra. He died in Dresden around 1780. His sons Antonín and Ludvík were also members of Staatskapelle Dresden. Organist Josef Neruda was his great-grandson. Cellist Franz Xaver Neruda was his great-great-grandson. Violinists Wilma Neruda and Maria Neruda were his great-great-granddaugters.

Works
His compositional output includes eighteen symphonies, fourteen instrumental concertos (including a trumpet and a bassoon concerto), sonatas, sacred works and an opera Les Troqueurs.
One of the composer's most significant works is the Concerto in E-flat for Trumpet and Strings written for Johann Georg Knechtel. Originally written for the "corno da caccia" or "post horn" using only the high register, it is now rarely performed on anything other than an E-flat or B-flat trumpet. Incidentally, the Corno da Caccia for which Neruda wrote is not to be confused with the 4-valved hunting horn which has recently been given the same name. The manuscript for this piece is in the National Library in Prague, along with several other unusual works for brass instruments.

References

Bibliography

 Contains a symphony in A written between 1745 and 1770 by Neruda (name given as Jan Křtitel Jiří Neruda)

External links

Czech Classical-period composers
Czech male classical composers
Czech conductors (music)
Male conductors (music)

Czech Baroque composers
1707 births
1780 deaths 
18th-century Bohemian musicians
18th-century classical composers
18th-century male musicians
18th-century conductors (music)